Cleo is a 2019 German drama film directed by Erik Schmitt.

Plot
Cleo works for a tourist office in Berlin and has lived a lonely, isolated life since her father died when Cleo was ten years old. Cleo blames herself for her father's death and has been hoping since childhood that a magical watch hidden in the Sass brothers' lost treasure will help her to turn back time and save her father. When she meets the young adventurer Paul one day, who has found a map that should lead to the treasure, she joins him, and Cleo begins a journey through Berlin's history, back to the beginning of time.

Cast 
 Marleen Lohse - Cleo
  - Paul
 Max Mauff - Zille
  - Günni
 Fabian Busch - Bernd
  - Bärbel
 Folke Renken - Historiker
 Andrea Sawatzki - Chefin

References

External links 

2019 drama films
2019 films
German drama films
2010s German-language films
Films set in Berlin
2010s German films